Vanessa Tomlinson (born 1971) is an Australian percussionist, composer, artistic director and educator. She is Director of Creative Arts Research Institute and Head of Percussion at Griffith University and has produced 150 publications. She is the co-founder and co-artistic director of Clocked Out, along with Erik Griswold.

Career 
In 1993 Tomlinson was awarded a recording contract with Etcetera Records, and won two awards for her percussion.

Upon completing her degree in Adelaide, Tomlinson studied with Bernhard Wulff and Robert van Sice at Musikhochschule Freiburg, Germany. She then moved to San Diego to complete a Masters under Steven Schick, and completed a Doctor Of Musical Arts in 2000.

Since 2000 she has collaborated with her partner Erik Griswold and released several albums together as Clocked Out Duo. They won two Green Room Awards for their collaboration Dada Cabare in 2000, and later won the Award for Excellence by an Organisation or Individual and Queensland State Award at 2011's APRA and AMC Art Music Awards for their work as Clocked Out.

In 2017 Tomlinson began a collaboration titled TOMLIN | FERGUS with Dr John Ferguson, an academic at the Queensland Conservatorium of Music where Tomlinson also taught.

In 2018 Tomlinson released her debut solo album The Space Inside on Room40 on cassette tape.

Discography
2019 - Pateras Collected Works Vol. II (2005-2018) Immediata 

2018 - The Space Inside Room40 

2017 - Ephemoral Rivers Hat Hut Records 

2017 - Water Pushes Sand Jazzhead Records 

2015 - Time Crystals Innova Records 

2015 - Daughters Fever Hellosquare Recordings 

2010 - From Small Things Grow Clocked Out 

2010 - fish boast of fishing Listen Hear Collective 

2010 - Foreign Objects Clocked Out 

2007 - Wide Alley Clocked Out 

2006 - Xenakis Complete Percussion Works Mode 

2004 - Mutant Theatre Tzadik 

2002 - Water Pushes Sand Clocked Out 

2000 - Every Night the Same Dream Clocked Out 

1997 - Ferneyhough Solo Works Etcetera

Awards

References

External links 
 
 Performance of Sonic Dream by Vanessa Tomlinson and John Ferguson (20 minute audio-video)

Living people
Australian women artists
Place of birth missing (living people)
1971 births